Gangaw District is a district of the Magway Division in central Myanmar. 

Pakokku is the capital city of Pakokku District and Gangaw District. In 1926, it became a part of Pakokku Hill Tracts Districts of British Burma until 1948, and was administratively part of Pakokku District until 2003.

Townships
The district contains the following townships:

Gangaw Township
Saw Township
Htilin Township

Districts of Myanmar
Magway Region